Jacob August Heyward (born August 1, 1995) is an American professional baseball outfielder who is currently a free agent. He played college baseball at the University of Miami. He was selected by the Giants in the 18th round of the 2016 Major League Baseball draft.

Amateur career

Heyward attended Eagle's Landing Christian Academy in McDonough, Georgia. In 2013, as a senior, he batted .331 with nine home runs and 42 RBIs and was drafted by the Atlanta Braves in the 38th round of the 2013 Major League Baseball draft. However, he did not sign and instead enrolled at the University of Miami where he played college baseball for the Miami Hurricanes.

In 2014, as a freshman at Miami, Heyward appeared in only 24 games. However, in 2015, his sophomore year, he broke out and emerged as Miami's starting left fielder, batting .327 with four home runs and 24 RBIs in 56 games. He also batted .355 in nine 2015 NCAA Division I baseball tournament games, including batting .455 in three games at the 2015 College World Series. Heyward returned in 2016 as the club's starting right fielder, hitting .242 with six home runs, 39 RBIs, and a .403 on-base percentage in 64 starts.

Professional career

After his junior year, he was selected by the San Francisco Giants in the 18th round of the 2016 Major League Baseball draft. He signed and made his professional debut for the Rookie-level Arizona League Giants, batting .337 with one home run, 21 RBIs, and ten stolen bases in 28 games. He also played in four games for the Salem-Keizer Volcanoes at the end of the year. In 2017, he played for the Augusta GreenJackets where he batted .223/.317/.351 with ten home runs and 45 RBIs in 107 games, and in 2018, he spent a majority of the year with the San Jose Giants, hitting .258/.357/.415 with 12 home runs, 47 RBIs, and 14 stolen bases in 112 games. He also played in two games for the Sacramento River Cats to end the season.

Heyward began 2019 with the Richmond Flying Squirrels and was named an Eastern League All-Star, earning All-Star game MVP honors. He was selected to play in the Arizona Fall League for the Scottsdale Scorpions following the season. He was promoted to the Sacramento River Cats at the end of the season, and finished the year there. Over 127 games between the two clubs, Heyward slashed .211/.362/.348 with 11 home runs, 47 RBIs, and 149 strikeouts in 388 at bats.

He then played for the Scottsdale Scorpions in the Arizona Fall League. He batted .184./.296/.421.

He did not play a minor league game in 2020 due to the cancellation of the minor league season caused by the COVID-19 pandemic. In the 2021 season, he played for Richmond, and batted .208 with 71 strikeouts in 202 at bats. 

In 2022 he returned to Richmond. He batted .201/.303/.337. He elected free agency on November 10, 2022.

Personal life

Heyward's brother, Jason, is an outfielder for the Los Angeles Dodgers.

References

External links

Living people
American baseball players
1995 births